Exebridge is a village that lies on the border between Devon and Somerset, England. It lies at the confluence of the Barle and Exe rivers. Exebridge is named so because of the bridge over the River Exe that also marks the border between Devon and Somerset.

Exmoor
Villages in Mid Devon District